Apukhtin is a Russian surname and may refer to:

 Aleksey Apukhtin (1840–1893), Russian poet, writer and critic
 German Apukhtin (1936–2003), Soviet footballer
 Alexander Apukthin (1822–1903), superintendent of Congress Poland in the late 19th century
  (born 1948), Ukrainian politician, self-proclaimed governor of Kharkiv People's Republic

Russian-language surnames